Oxydactylus is an extinct genus of camelid endemic to North America. The name is from the Ancient Greek οξύς (oxys, "sharp")and δάκτυλος (daktylos, "finger").

 
They had very long legs and necks, and were probably adapted to eating high vegetation, much like modern giraffes. Unlike modern camelids, they had hooves, rather than tough sole-pads, and splayed toes.

References

Prehistoric camelids
Oligocene even-toed ungulates
Miocene even-toed ungulates
Serravallian genus extinctions
Miocene mammals of North America
Oligocene mammals of North America
Prehistoric even-toed ungulate genera
Chattian genus first appearances
Aquitanian genera
Burdigalian genera
Langhian genera
Fossil taxa described in 1904